Shango is the fifth album released by the multi-genre trance group Juno Reactor. The tracks "Pistolero" and "Masters of the Universe" were released as singles.

Track listing
All tracks made by Ben Watkins with collaborators mentioned on the track list.

 "Pistolero" – 6:13 (co-produced by Steve Stevens)
 "Hule Lam" – 4:00 (co-produced by Amampondo)
 "Insects" – 6:18 (co-produced by Mike Maguire)
 "Badimo" – 7:14 (co-produced by Nick Burton, Mabi Thobejane)
 "Masters of the Universe" – 6:05 (co-produced by Johann Bley, Mabi Thobejane)
 "Nitrogen (Part 1)" – 8:34 (co-produced by Alex Paterson, Greg Hunter)
 "Nitrogen (Part 2)" – 6:26 (co-produced by Stephen Holweck)
 "Solaris" – 8:58 (co-produced by Deepak Ram)
 "Song for Ancestors" – 8:09 (co-produced by Taz Alexander, Mabi Thobejane)

Personnel

 Produced by Juno Reactor
 Ben Watkins – producer
 Greg Hunter – engineering
 Otto The Barbarian – engineering
 Richard Edwards – engineering
 Steev Toth – engineering
 Kevin Metcalfe – mastering
 Steve Stevens – guitar (on "Pistolero")
 B.J. Cole – pedal steel guitar
 Pandit Dinesh – tabla
 Boris Salchack – vocals/strings
 Busi Mhlongo – vocals
 Taz Alexander – vocals
 Mike Diver – artwork
 Squalis – artwork

References

 JunoReactor.com profile of Shango

2000 albums
Juno Reactor albums
Trance albums